The Glass Key award is a literature award given annually to a crime novel by an author from the Nordic countries.

The award, named after the novel The Glass Key by American crime writer Dashiell Hammett, is a real glass key given every year by the members of the Crime Writers of Scandinavia to a crime novel written by a Danish, Finnish, Icelandic, Norwegian or Swedish author. Each country's members put forth a candidate novel, making up the shortlist.

Winners

References

External links 
  Glass Key winners (through 2004)

Mystery and detective fiction awards